SN 1940B was a supernova discovered on 5 May 1940 in the galaxy NGC 4725 in Coma Berenices. It had a magnitude of 12.8 and became the first observed type II supernova.

SN 1940B is one of the five supernovae discovered in 1940, the other being SN 1940A, SN 1940C, SN 1940D and SN 1940E.

References

External links
Light curve  on the Open Supernova Catalog
SN 1940B at SIMBAD

Supernovae
Astronomical objects discovered in 1940
Coma Berenices